Alexander Frank Hall (17 September 1909 – 1992) was an English professional footballer who played as a wing half.

References

1909 births
1992 deaths
Footballers from Grimsby
English footballers
Association football wing halves
Cleethorpes Town F.C. players
Grimsby Town F.C. players
Alford United F.C. players
English Football League players